The 1991 New Zealand bravery awards were announced via a Special Honours List dated 19 December 1991. Twelve of the 33 recipients were recognised for acts of bravery during the Aramoana Massacre on 13 November 1990.

In relation to the Aramoana Massacre

George Cross (GC)
 Stewart James Guthrie – sergeant, New Zealand Police. Posthumous

George Medal (GM)
 Eva Helen Dickson – of Aramoana.

Queen's Gallantry Medal (QGM)
 Victor James Crimp  – of Aramoana. Posthumous

 Don Nicholas Fraser Harvey – constable, New Zealand Police.
 Paul Alan Knox – detective, New Zealand Police.

 Terry Edward Van Turnhout – constable, New Zealand Police.
 David Thomas Weir – senior constable, New Zealand Police.

Queen's Commendation for Brave Conduct
 Michael Arthur Kyne – sergeant, New Zealand Police
 Timothy Philip Ashton – constable, New Zealand Police
 Robert William Barlass – constable, New Zealand Police
 Peter Gerard McCarthy – constable, New Zealand Police

 Chiquita Danielle Holden.

In relation to other events

George Medal (GM)
 Royd Philip Kennedy – senior fire fighter, No. 1A01 District (Auckland), New Zealand Fire Service.

 Peter Morris Umbers – senior constable, New Zealand Police. Posthumous

Queen's Gallantry Medal (QGM)
 Sergeant John Akurangi – Royal New Zealand Infantry Regiment.

 Warrant Officer Class Two Kevin Charles Friis – Royal New Zealand Infantry Regiment (Regular Force) (Retired).

 Peter Wallace Sutton. 

 James Lindsay Thomas – traffic officer, Traffic Safety Service, Ministry of Transport.

Queen's Commendation for Brave Conduct
 James Rangi Samuel Toheroa Robinson – custody manager, New Zealand Prison Service, Department of Justice, Christchurch.

 Squadron Leader Stephen Geoffrey Bone – Royal New Zealand Air Force.
 Flight Sergeant Ross Stephen Paterson – Royal New Zealand Air Force.

 Lee Frances Vogel.

 Alan Brian Lawry – corporal, Royal New Zealand Corps of Transport (Retired).

 Paul David Garrett – traffic sergeant, Traffic Safety Service, Ministry of Transport

 Kevin Barry Reid.

 Ian David Harrison – traffic officer, Traffic Safety Service, Ministry of Transport

 Peter Bruce Waring-Taylor Clarke – sergeant, New Zealand Police.

 Scott Allan Barclay – gunner, Royal Regiment of New Zealand Artillery.

 Murray John Whitmore – sergeant, New Zealand Police.

 Owen Haslam Woods – assistant commander, No 1AO1 District (Auckland}, New Zealand Fire Service.
 Raymond Warby – divisional officer, No 1AO1 District (Auckland), New Zealand Fire Service.

 Kevin Bruce Anderson – traffic officer, Traffic Safety Service, Ministry of Transport

 Brent Thorpe.

References

Bravery
Bravery awards
New Zealand bravery awards